Edward Colman may refer to:
Edward Colman (martyr) (1636–1678), English Catholic martyr
Edward Colman (serjeant-at-arms) (c. 1734–1815), English politician, courtier, and Serjeant-at-Arms of the House of Commons
Edward Colman (American politician) (1828–1898), American Civil War officer and member of the Wisconsin State Senate
Edward Colman (cinematographer) (1905–1995), American cinematographer
Eddie Colman (1936–1958), English footballer

See also
Edward Coleman (disambiguation)